Christopher Blair Gaffaney (born 30 November 1975) is a former New Zealand cricketer who played for the Otago Volts.  A right-handed batsman, he played in 83 First-Class matches and 113 List-A matches. At present he serves as an international cricket umpire. Gaffaney is currently a member of the ICC Elite umpire panel and officiates in Tests, ODIs and T20Is.

Umpiring career
Gaffaney made his ODI umpiring debut in a match played between Canada and Ireland at Toronto in September 2010. He served as an umpire on the ICC International Panel of Umpires and later stood in his first Test match in a game between Zimbabwe and South Africa at Harare in August 2014.

Gaffaney was thereafter selected as one of the twenty umpires to stand in matches during the 2015 Cricket World Cup and stood in three matches as an on-field umpire during the tournament. A few months later he was elevated to the ICC Elite umpire panel for 2015–16 as a result of his several consistent performances.

In April 2019, he was named as one of the sixteen umpires to stand in matches during the 2019 Cricket World Cup.

In September 2020, he was named as one of the fifteen umpires to offficate in matches during the 2020 Indian Premier League and stood in the final as well.

See also
 List of Test cricket umpires
 List of ODI cricket umpires
 List of T20I cricket umpires

References

External links

1975 births
Living people
New Zealand cricketers
Otago cricketers
Cricketers from Dunedin
New Zealand Test cricket umpires
New Zealand One Day International cricket umpires
New Zealand Twenty20 International cricket umpires
South Island cricketers